Joseph Mooney was an English professional footballer who played as a full back. He made just one appearance in the Football League for Burnley in the 1905–06 season.

References

English footballers
Association football defenders
Burnley F.C. players
English Football League players
Year of death missing
Year of birth missing